Robenhausen is a locality in Wetzikon, one of the municipalities of the canton of Zürich, Switzerland. The wetland Robenhauser Ried belongs to the protected area surrounding Pfäffikersee. The prehistoric pile dwelling around Lake Zurich Wetzikon-Robenhausen is part of the UNESCO-defined World Heritage Sites, the prehistoric pile dwellings around the Alps.

Geography 
Robenhausen is located in the Hinwil District in the Zürcher Oberland at the southeastern lake shore of Pfäffikersee. The so-called Robenhauser Ried (Swiss German: Robenhusener Riet) is a protected reed landscape. The Aabach stream drains the Robenhauser Ried wetlands and the lake, and it flows into the Ustermer Aa.

Transportation 
The bus line operator Verkehrsbetriebe Zürichsee und Oberland (VZO) provides the local bus transport in Wetzikon for the regions of the Oberland and the upper northeastern shore of Lake Zurich.

Robenhauser Ried 
From the beginning of the 18th century until about 1950 there peat was cut.

UNESCO World Heritage Site 

The area at the southern end of the Pfäffikersee lake shore has been inhabited for over 10,000 years. Neolithic hunters and collectors built during the European Mesolithic at various locations storage bins, and in the Neolithic period several small, permanently inhabited settlements near the shore. 

The remains of the Neolithic settlements in the protected marsh area were discovered by Jakob Messikommer between 1856 and 1858. On occasion of several excavations to the 1900s, Messikommer reported the discovery of numerous individual finds, and first, he also interpreted two different layers a settlement that was rebuilt, and in fact he was right. Jakob Messikommer's achievements were honored with a memorial stone and the so-called Messikomer Eich, an oak in the Robenhausen reed.

The prehistoric settlement is part of the UNESCO World Heritage Site Prehistoric Pile dwellings around the Alps, being one of 111 locations with the greatest scientific potential. In the Swiss inventory of cultural property of national significance Robenhausen is listed as Class A object.

See also 
 Prehistoric pile dwellings around Zürichsee

Literature 
 Peter J. Suter, Helmut Schlichtherle et al.: Pfahlbauten – Palafittes – Palafitte. Palafittes, Biel 2009. .
 Pfahlbaufieber. Von Antiquaren, Pfahlbaufischern, Altertümerhändlern und Pfahlbaumythen. Mitteilungen der Antiquarischen Gesellschaft in Zürich, volume 71. Chronos, Zürich 2004.

References

External links 

 Official website of the municipality of Wetzikon 

Wetlands of Switzerland
Wetzikon
Protected areas of Switzerland
Pfäffikersee